Tsat or TSAT may refer to:
 Tsat language, a language spoken in Hainan, China
 Thinking Schools Academy Trust, a multi-academy trust in the United Kingdom
 Tarlac School of Arts and Trades, now Tarlac State University, Philippines
 Transformational Satellite Communications System
 Transferrin saturation in medicine, the ratio of serum iron and total iron-binding capacity
 Tsat, a Cantonese vulgar word
 Tilted single axis tracker, a type of solar tracker
 Target Startup Approval Times, see DMAN for further details
 Tactical Situational Awareness Test, a method to measure situational awareness at the small unit tactical level